Telicota brachydesma, the small darter, is a butterfly of the family Hesperiidae. It is found in Australia (the north-eastern coast of Queensland), the Aru Islands, Papua Province and Papua New Guinea.

The wingspan is about 25 mm.

The larvae feed on Leptaspis banksii.

External links
Australian Insects
Australian Faunal Directory

Taractrocerini
Butterflies described in 1908